Bremen, officially the Free Hanseatic City of Bremen, is the smallest and least populous of Germany's 16 states. It is informally called  ("State of Bremen"), although the term is sometimes used in official contexts. The state consists of the city of Bremen and its seaport exclave, Bremerhaven, surrounded by the larger state of Lower Saxony in northern Germany.

Geography
The state of Bremen consists of two non-contiguous territories. These enclaves contain Bremen, officially the 'City' (Stadtgemeinde Bremen) which is the state capital, and the city of Bremerhaven (Stadt Bremerhaven). Both are located on the River Weser; Bremerhaven ("Bremen's harbour") is further downstream on the mouth of the Weser with open access to the North Sea. Both enclaves are completely surrounded by the neighbouring State of Lower Saxony (Niedersachsen). The highest point in the state is in Friedehorst Park (32.5m).

History

When the Holy Roman Empire was dissolved in 1806, the Free Imperial City of Bremen (as of 1646, after earlier privileges of autonomy of 1186) was not mediatised (incorporated into the enlarged territory of one of the surrounding monarchies) but became a sovereign state officially titled the Free Hanseatic City of Bremen. Her currency was the Bremen thaler (until 1873). In 1811, the First French Empire annexed the city-state in an effort to enforce Napoleon's Berlin Decree, closing the European continent to British trade.

At the Congress of Vienna of 1815, Bremen's emissary, and later burgomaster, Johann Smidt, lobbied successfully to have the city's independence confirmed as one of the 39 sovereign states within the new German Confederation.

In 1827, Bremen bought land at the mouth of the Weser from the Kingdom of Hanover, in order to build a new seaport, Bremerhaven. This ensured that Bremen remained Germany's main port of embarkation for emigrants to the Americas, and later that it developed as an entrepôt for Germany's late developing colonial trade.

In 1867, the year following Prussia's defeat of Austria and its annexation of Hanover, Bremen joined the North German Confederation that became the German Empire in 1871, as one of its 26 constituent states.

As an international port and industrial centre, Bremen had a strong left and liberal tradition. In January 1913, at the last elections to the Imperial Reichstag in Berlin, the Social Democrats (SPD) secured over half the vote, or 53.4%. Left Liberals (Linksliberale) took another 41.4%. Only 5.1% went to the Conservatives. During the Weimar Republic, there were seven elections to the Burgerschaft, the Bremen parliament. At the November 1932 German federal election, the last broadly free election during this time, the Social Democrats won 31.2% of the vote, and the Communists (KPD) 16.8%, compared to 20.8% for the Nazis.

Following the heavily compromised national elections of March 1933, the Nazis still achieved only a third of the popular vote in Bremen (32.7%). Bremen, like all the German states, then underwent the process of Gleichschaltung (coordination) whereby the Nazi regime, through a campaign of violent demonstrations and intimidation, first forced the resignation of the executive Senate and later dissolved the Bürgerschaft. Bremen remained for the next twelve years under the direct authority of a Reichsstatthalter (Reich Governor) who simultaneously held the post of Nazi Party Gauleiter of Gau Weser-Ems. During these years, Bremen's small Jewish community (1,438 people registered at the beginning of 1933) was destroyed through coerced emigration and deportation to death camps in the occupied east.

Allied bombing destroyed the majority of the historical Hanseatic city as well as 60% of the built-up area of Bremen during World War II. The British 3rd Infantry Division under General Lashmer Whistler captured Bremen in late April 1945. The British handed it over to the Americans; Bremen became an American-controlled port for the supply of the US zones of occupation in west Berlin and southern Germany.

Bremen was reestablished as a state in 1947 and, from 1949, was again known as the Free Hanseatic City of Bremen, becoming a Land or state of the new Federal Republic of Germany, informally referred to as "West Germany" until 1990.

Politics

Political system

The legislature of the state of Bremen is the 83-member Bürgerschaft (citizens' assembly), elected by the citizens in the two cities of Bremen and Bremerhaven.

The executive is constituted by the Senate of Bremen, elected by the Bürgerschaft. The Senate is chaired by the President of the senate (Senatspräsident), who is also one of the mayors of the city of Bremen (Bürgermeister) and is elected directly by the Bürgerschaft. The Senate selects of its members as a second mayor who serves as deputy of the president. In contrast to the Federal Chancellor of Germany or other German states, the President of the Senate has no authority to override senators on policy, which is decided upon by the senate collectively. Since 1945, the Senate has continuously been dominated by the Social Democratic Party.

On a municipal level, the two cities in the state are administered separately:
 The administration of the city of Bremen is headed by the two mayors and controlled by the portion of the Bürgerschaft elected in the city of Bremen (68 members).
 Bremerhaven, on the other hand, has a municipal assembly distinct from the state legislature and an administration under a distinct head mayor (Oberbürgermeister) and a distinct second mayor.

Political majorities
In post-war Bremen, the port, shipyards and related industries sustained a large and unionised working class. As before 1933, this translated into support for the Social Democrats, considered Bremen's natural governing party. However, in the 1980s mechanisation of the port and closure of the city's leading shipbuilder induced an employment crisis and shook the confidence of the party's traditional voter base. The SPD, which had still polled 51% in 1987, lost its effective majority. The once dominant left-liberal vote split, and coalition government became the norm.

The 2019 Bremen state election was held on 26 May 2019 to elect the members of the Bürgerschaft of Bremen, as well as the city councils of Bremen and Bremerhaven. The election took place on the same day as the 2019 European Parliament election. The Christian Democratic Union (CDU), for the first time, became the largest party in the Bürgerschaft, while the Social Democratic Party (SPD) fell to second place. The Greens and The Left made small gains. After the election, the SPD, Greens, and Left agreed to form a coalition government. Carsten Sieling resigned as mayor and was replaced by fellow SPD member Andreas Bovenschulte.

|-
! rowspan="2" colspan="2" | Party
! rowspan="2" | Votes
! rowspan="2" | %
! rowspan="2" | +/-
! colspan="2" | Seats
! rowspan="2" | Totalseats
! rowspan="2" | +/-
! rowspan="2" | Seats %
|-
! Bremen
! Bremerhaven
|-
| bgcolor=| 
| align=left | Christian Democratic Union (CDU)
| align=right| 391,709
| align=right| 26.7
| align=right| 4.3
| align=right| 20
| align=right| 4
| align=right| 24
| align=right| 4
| align=right| 28.6
|-
| bgcolor=| 
| align=left | Social Democratic Party (SPD)
| align=right| 366,375
| align=right| 24.9
| align=right| 7.9
| align=right| 19
| align=right| 4
| align=right| 23
| align=right| 7
| align=right| 27.4
|-
| bgcolor=| 
| align=left | Alliance 90/The Greens (Grüne)
| align=right| 256,181
| align=right| 17.4
| align=right| 2.3
| align=right| 13
| align=right| 3
| align=right| 16
| align=right| 2
| align=right| 19.0
|-
| bgcolor=| 
| align=left | The Left (Linke)
| align=right| 166,378
| align=right| 11.3
| align=right| 1.8
| align=right| 9
| align=right| 1
| align=right| 10
| align=right| 2
| align=right| 11.9
|-
| bgcolor=| 
| align=left | Alternative for Germany (AfD)
| align=right| 89,939
| align=right| 6.1
| align=right| 0.6
| align=right| 4
| align=right| 1
| align=right| 5
| align=right| 1
| align=right| 6.0
|-
| bgcolor=| 
| align=left | Free Democratic Party (FDP)
| align=right| 87,420
| align=right| 5.9
| align=right| 0.7
| align=right| 4
| align=right| 1
| align=right| 5
| align=right| 1
| align=right| 6.0
|-
| bgcolor=| 
| align=left | Citizens in Rage (BiW)
| align=right| 35,808
| align=right| 2.4
| align=right| 0.8
| align=right| 0
| align=right| 1
| align=right| 1
| align=right| 0
| align=right| 1.2
|-
! colspan=8|
|-
| bgcolor=| 
| align=left | Die PARTEI (PARTEI)
| align=right| 24,433
| align=right| 1.7
| align=right| 0.2
| align=right| 0
| align=right| 0
| align=right| 0
| align=right| ±0
| align=right| 0
|-
| 
| align=left | Free Voters (FW)
| align=right| 14,205
| align=right| 1.0
| align=right| 1.0
| align=right| 0
| align=right| 0
| align=right| 0
| align=right| ±0
| align=right| 0
|-
| bgcolor=|
| align=left | Pirate Party Germany (Piraten)
| align=right| 14,143
| align=right| 1.0
| align=right| 0.5
| align=right| 0
| align=right| 0
| align=right| 0
| align=right| ±0
| align=right| 0
|-
| bgcolor=|
| align=left | Others
| align=right| 22,915
| align=right| 1.6
| align=right| 
| align=right| 0
| align=right| 0
| align=right| 0
| align=right| ±0
| align=right| 0
|-
! align=right colspan=2| Total
! align=right| 1,469,506
! align=right| 100.0
! align=right| 
! align=right| 69
! align=right| 15
! align=right| 84
! align=right| 1
! align=right| 
|-
! align=right colspan=2| Voter turnout
! align=right| 
! align=right| 64.1
! align=right| 13.9
! align=right| 
! align=right| 
! align=right| 
! align=right| 
! align=right| 
|}

Coat of arms
The coat of arms and flag of Bremen state include:

Economy
Bremen's post-World War II economy boomed in line with the West German Wirtschaftswunder of the 1950s and 60s. This saw the growth, and permanent settlement, in Bremen of a large migrant worker population, drawn largely from Turkey and southern Europe.

Some of the city's heavier industries failed to recover from the oil-price-shock recession of the early 1970s. Specialist construction yards, ship outfitters and parts suppliers remain, but AG Weser (which employed 16,000 workers at its peak) and Bremer Vulcan, Bremen's major shipbuilders, closed in 1983 and 1997 respectively. Further job losses were caused by the restructuring and increasing mechanisation of harbour-related activities and other industrial sectors. Semi and unskilled harbour workers found it very difficult to re-enter the labour market, and unemployment—for a period in the 1980s almost double the West German average—remained comparatively high.

At a time when structural change in the economy has forced Bremen to spend more on social services. Suburbanisation has reduced population and tax revenue. Incorporating surrounding suburban municipalities, is not an option for Bremen as these belong to the state of Lower Saxony.

With financial assistance from the European Union, and from the Federal Government, economic policy has focussed on supporting those established economic sectors that are based on advanced technology, such as aerospace and aircraft production, automobile production, maritime and logistics services, and on developing the education and business-park infrastructure for new science-based and digital enterprises. In this an important tole is accorded to the growing university sector. Further investment went into the revitalisation of the city centre but a culture-driven regeneration around entertainment and tourism was not very successful. Several experts described Bremen's service sector as underdeveloped, due to a lack of major company headquarters.

Unemployment 
At the turn of the new century, unemployment in Bremen stood at 13%, a rate matched in the Federal Republic only by the "new states" in former East Germany. By 2022, while reduced to 10.2% it was the highest among all 16 German states.

Industries
Despite historic job losses in the industrial sector, Bremen State has retained, and continues to develop, a broad manufacturing base:

Automotive with Mercedes-Benz factory, which is main manufacturing base of C-Class (12,500 employees). Automotive components from Hella and Lear. Assembly lines for powertrain and batteries are supplied from ThyssenKrupp Automation Engineering.
Aerospace with Airbus aircraft component factories (4,100 employees), rocket components Ariane (550 empl.) and spacecraft OHB (1,200 empl.)
Iron & Steel with large ArcelorMittal work (3,000 employees);
Electronic manufacturers for naval/marine Atlas Elektronik (1,400 employees) and defence Rheinmetall Defence Electronics (1,200 employees)
Shipbuilding represented Lürssen Bremen features the full spectrum of construction, production and assembly facilities for superyachts greater than 100 in length (1,200 employees).
Food manufacturing of coffee (Kraft, Jacobs, Melitta, Eduscho, Azul), chocolate (Hachez), beer (Beck's Brewery), cereal food (Kellogg's), fish (Frosta, Frozen Fish, Deutsche See), dairy products (DMK Deutsches Milchkontor), pet food (Vitacraft)

Education
The University of Bremen is the largest university in Bremen. It is one of 11 institutions classed as an "Elite university" in Germany, and teaches approximately 23,500 people from 126 countries. Bremen also has a University of the Arts Bremen, a University of Applied Sciences with campuses in both Bremen city and Bremerhaven, and more recently the Jacobs University Bremen, an international research university located in Vegesack.

See also

 Bombing of Bremen in World War II
 Former countries in Europe after 1815
 Timeline of Bremen (city) history

References

External links

 Official state portal
 Official governmental portal
 Constitution of the state, German only
 

 
States of the German Empire
States of the German Confederation
States of the North German Confederation
States of the Weimar Republic
History of Bremen (city)
History of Bremen (state)
NUTS 1 statistical regions of the European Union
States and territories established in 1646
1646 establishments in the Holy Roman Empire
17th-century establishments in the Holy Roman Empire
States of Germany